Verbeeck is a surname of Dutch language origin. It is a contraction and spelling variant of the toponym Van der Beek, meaning "from the stream/brook/creek".  People with this surname include:. Notable people with the surname include:

Cornelis Verbeeck (1590–1637), Dutch Golden Age painter
Frans Verbeeck (fl  1531–1570), Flemish painter
Frans Verbeeck (cyclist) (born 1941), Belgian cyclist
François Xaver Henri Verbeeck (1686–1755), Flemish painter
Katrien Verbeeck (born 1980), Belgian singer
Maarten Verbeeck (1563–1624), Dutch Jesuit theologian (Martinus Becanus)
Oscar Verbeeck (1891–1971), Belgian footballer
Pieter Cornelisz Verbeeck (1610–1654), Dutch Golden Age painter
Théo Verbeeck (1889–1951), Belgian footballer and chairman
Yvonne Verbeeck (1913–2012), Belgian actor

See also
Verbeek
Verbeke

Dutch-language surnames